The Jura Observatory is an astronomical observatory owned and operated by the Jura Astronomy Society (SJA). Built in 1993/1998, it is located near Vicques in the Canton of Jura, Switzerland. Its IAU observatory code is 185.

On August 28, 2008, Michel Ory discovered the periodic comet P/2008 Q2 (Ory) at the observatory.

Oukaïmeden Observatory 

The Jura Astronomy Society, in collaboration with French amateur astronomer Claudine Rinner and the Cadi Ayyad University, also participates in the Morocco Oukaïmeden Sky Survey (MOSS), using a remote 0.5-meter telescope at Oukaïmeden Observatory, which is operated by the university since 2007. The observatory is located in the High Atlas mountains, 50 kilometers south of Marrakech, Morocco.

List of discovered minor planets

See also

References

External links 
 Jura Observatory, homepage of the Jura Astronomy Society
 MOSS project
 Optical seeing monitoring at the Oukaïmeden in the Moroccan high atlas mountains: first statistics
 Astronomie Marrakech

Astronomical observatories in Switzerland
Buildings and structures in the canton of Jura

Minor-planet discovering observatories